Between Here & Lost is the debut album by American Christian metal band Love and Death. It was released January 22, 2013 through Tooth & Nail Records.

History

An album was announced to be in progress with the official re-branding announcement of Welch's solo project in February 2012. The album's release was preceded by the EP Chemicals, which featured three songs from the forthcoming album, as well as two remixes. The band continued to record and tour throughout 2012, and in September they announced the release date for the album to be November 20. Shortly before the release date announcement, Welch stated that the band had just signed a deal with Tooth & Nail Records and EMI to release the album. Shortly before the release date, the label pushed the release back to January 22, 2013.

According to Welch, "this record was birthed from trials, tribulations, pain, suffering, anxiety, depression, and drama. However, we came out on top and the end result is a very real, raw & honest record." The band also revealed they would be touring in 2013 to support the album. An expanded edition was released on September 17, 2013 and features three bonus tracks.

Track listing

Charts

Personnel 

Love and Death
 Brian 'Head' Welch – lead vocals, rhythm guitar 
 JR Bareis - lead guitar, backing vocals
 Michael Valentine - bass guitar, backing vocals
 Dan Johnson - drums

Additional musicians
 Matt Baird - vocals on "Whip It"
 Mattie Montgomery - vocals on "I W8 4 U"
 Joe Rickard - drums on "Paralyzed"
 Jasen Rauch - programming

Production
 Jasen Rauch - producing, remixing on tracks 13, 14
 Paul Pavao - mixing
 Ben Grosse - mixing
 Buckley Miller - drums engineering

References

2013 debut albums
Love and Death (band) albums
Tooth & Nail Records albums